Alena Andrianovna Serzhantova (6 May 1998) is a Russian water polo player.

She competed for the Russian national team at the 2014 Women's European Water Polo Championship, and 2017 World Aquatics Championships

See also
 List of World Aquatics Championships medalists in water polo

References

External links
  Alena Serzhantova

Russian female water polo players
1998 births
Living people
European Games gold medalists for Russia
Water polo players at the 2015 European Games
World Aquatics Championships medalists in water polo
European Games medalists in water polo
Water polo players at the 2020 Summer Olympics
Olympic water polo players of Russia
21st-century Russian women